Zheng Yichai (born 1 February 1998) is a Chinese archer. In 2019, she won the silver medal in both the individual and the team event at the 2019 Asian Archery Championships held in Bangkok, Thailand.

In 2019, she won the silver medal in the mixed team event at the 2019 Military World Games held in Wuhan, China, alongside Feng Hao.

References

External links 
 

Living people
1998 births
Place of birth missing (living people)
Chinese female archers
21st-century Chinese women